Kollagunta is a village in Chittoor district of the Indian state of Andhra Pradesh. It is located in Karvetinagar mandal.kollagunta village situated exactly at Andhrapradesh and Tamil Nadu Border.

About 
According to Census 2011 information the location code or village code of Kollagunta village is 596433. It is situated 12 km away from sub-district headquarter Karvetinagaram and 42 km away from district headquarter Chittoor. As per 2009 stats, Kollagunta village is also a gram panchayat.

The total geographical area of the village is 355 hectares. Kollagunta has a total population of 3,394 peoples. There are about 833 houses in Kollagunta village. Tirupati is the nearest town to Kollagunta which is approximately 55 km away.

Temples in Kollagunta Village 
 Padiveti Amma 
 Kanakamedalamma (Grama Devatha)
 Om Shakthi
 Darmaraja Temple 
 Lord Vinayaka
 Ayyappa Swamy
 Muneswara Swamy
Krishna bajan mandir.
Lord Muruga (Inside of Kanakamedalamma temple)
Lord Shiva (Inside of Kanakamedalamma temple)

Village Festivals in Kollagunta Village 
 Ganga Jathara: They will conduct in The month of March 2 Days Festival
 Darmaraja Tirunallu: They will conduct in the month of MaY 18 Days Festivals
 Ayyappa Jyothi Pooja in the Month Of Oct-Dec.
Om Shakthi Pooja in the month of Oct -Nov will be conducted
Lord Vinayaka Festival celebrate by Youth

References 

Villages in Chittoor district